The 2010 Goiás gubernatorial election was held on October 3, as part of the general election in Brazil. In this election, four million citizens from the state of Goiás were eligible to vote to determine the successor to incumbent Governor Alcides Rodrigues, from the center-right Progressive Party (PP).

Because of term limits, Rodrigues was constitutionally forbidden to run once he finished Marconi Perillo's term, which he assumed in 2006 when Perillo left the office to run for the Senate. During his administration, Rodrigues parted ways with his predecessor, and went on to support the candidacy of Vanderlan Cardoso, the former mayor of Senador Canedo, from the Republic Party (PR). Despite the Governor's support for Cardoso, the leading candidates were former Governors Iris Rezende of the Brazilian Democratic Movement Party (PMDB), and Marconi Perillo of the Brazilian Social Democratic Party (PSDB). Other candidates included Washington Fraga from the Socialism and Liberty Party (PSOL) and Marta Jane from the Brazilian Communist Party (PCB). 

As none of the candidates received more than half of the valid votes, a run-off was held on October 31, 2010.

On October 3, citizens from Goiás voted for their representatives in both Federal (Chamber of Deputies and Senate) and local level (Legislative Assembly) legislatures, in addition to the next President of Brazil.

Opinion polling

References

2010 Brazilian gubernatorial elections
October 2010 events in South America
2010